Kilfian is a civil parish within the barony of Tirawley, County Mayo, Ireland.  It is traditionally a rural community, located between the towns of Belderrig, Crossmolina, Killala and Ballycastle.

Kilfian was the birthplace of Lady Sarah Fleming (née McElroy), wife of Sir Alexander Fleming.

References

External links
Kilfian Community Website
Kilfian genealogical information 

Civil parishes of County Mayo